Officine Meccaniche (from 1962 to 1998 called Studi di registrazione sonora Regson) is a recording studio located in Milan, Italy. It was owned by Carlo e Umberto Zanibelli e Lidia Gualtieri from 1962 until 1998. Since then, it has been owned by Mauro Pagani, a long time violinist of Premiata Forneria Marconi.

Albums recorded at the studio

Giorgio Gaber
 Il signor G (1970)
 I borghesi (1971)
Franco Battiato
 Fetus (1972)
 Pollution (1972)
 Sulle corde di Aries (1973)
Juri Camisasca
 La finestra dentro (1974)
 Enzo Jannacci
 Quelli che... (1975)
 O vivere o ridere (1976)
Gilda
 Bolle di sapone (1976)
Adriano Celentano
 Yuppi du (1975)
 Svalutation (1976)
 Tecadisk (1977)
 Ti avrò (1978)
 Léo Ferré
 Il est six heures ici et midi à New York (1979)
 La Violence et l'Ennui (1980)
 L'Imaginaire (1982)
 L'Opéra du pauvre (1983)
 Les Loubards (1985)
 On n'est pas sérieux quand on a dix-sept ans (1986)
 Les Vieux Copains (1990)
 Une saison en enfer (1991)
New Trolls
 Aldebaran (1978)
Fabrizio Marzi
 Zoo (1978)
 Amanda Lear
 Tam-Tam (1983)

 Iva Zanicchi
 Care colleghe (1987)
 Nefertari (1988)
 Elio e le Storie Tese
 Esco dal mio corpo e ho molta paura: Gli inediti 1979–1986 (1993)
 Peerla (1998)
 Cicciput (2003)
De Sfroos
 Manicomi (1995)
Pierangelo Bertoli
 Angoli di vita (1997)
Massimo Ranieri
 Oggi o dimane (2001)
Nun è acqua
Francesco Baccini
 Forza Francesco! (2001)
PFM
 Dracula Opera Rock (2005)
Casino Royale
 Reale (2001)
Le Vibrazioni
 Officine meccaniche (2006)
 Le Strade del tempo (2010)
Afterhours
 Ballads for Little Hyenas (2006)
Muse
 Black Holes and Revelations (2006)
 Drones (2015)
Daniele Silvestri
Unò dué
 Il latitante (2007)
Verdena
 Solo un grande sasso (2001)
 Requiem (2007)

Morgan
 Da A ad A (teoria delle catastrofi) (2007)
Marta sui tubi
 Sushi & Coca (2008)
Mokadelic
 Come Dio comanda (2008)
Beaucoup Fish
 Lascio tutto (2009)
Moltheni
 Ingrediente novus (2009)
Elisa
 Heart (2009)
Irene Fornaciari
 Vintage Boy (2009)
Domani 21/04.09 song recorded to raise money for the survivors of 2009 L'Aquila earthquake.
Il Teatro degli Orrori
 A sangue freddo (2009)
Calibro 35
 Ritornano quelli di... (2010)
Corni Petar
 Ruggine (2010)
Tricarico
 L'imbarazzo (2011)
Giusy Ferreri
 Il mio universo
Vinicio Capossela
 Marinai, profeti e balene (2011)
 Lady Gaga
 Born This Way (2011)
 Lacuna Coil
 Dark Adrenaline (2012)
 Broken Crown Halo (2014)

External links
 
 

Recording studios in Italy
Mass media companies established in 1962
Italian companies established in 1962